The 1967 World Table Tennis Championships men's singles was the 29th edition of the men's singles championship. 

Nobuhiko Hasegawa defeated Mitsuru Kono in the final, winning three sets to two to secure the title.

Results

See also
List of World Table Tennis Championships medalists

References

-